Znamensky District is an administrative and municipal district (raion), one of the thirty-two in Omsk Oblast, Russia. It is located in the north of the oblast. Its administrative center is the rural locality (a selo) of Znamenskoye. Population: 12,427 (2010 Census);  The population of Znamenskoye accounts for 42.6% of the district's total population.

References

Notes

Sources

Districts of Omsk Oblast